Andrew McCarthy (born 1962) is an American actor. 

Andrew McCarthy may also refer to: 

Andrew C. McCarthy (born 1959), American attorney and author
Andrew McCarthy (footballer), Scottish athlete